HMS Hannibal was a 74-gun third rate ship of the line of the Royal Navy, built by Adams of Bucklers Hard and launched in May 1810.

Between 1810 and 1811 Hannibal served as flagship to Rear-Admiral Sir Thomas Williams and then Rear-Admiral Philip Durham. On 26 March 1814 Hannibal, and  encountered the French frigates Sultane and Etoile, which were returning from the Cape Verde Islands and a cruise of commerce raiding. Hannibal set off after Sultane and sent Hebrus and Sparrow after Etoile. Both French vessels were captured the next day. Hannibal captured Sultane without a fight.  captured Étoile, but only after severe fighting at the ensuing Battle of Jobourg.

She was used for harbour service from August 1825. Hannibal was broken up in December 1833 at Pembroke Dock.

Citations

References

 
 Lavery, Brian (2003) The Ship of the Line - Volume 1: The development of the battlefleet 1650-1850. Conway Maritime Press. .

 

Ships of the line of the Royal Navy
Fame-class ships of the line
Ships built on the Beaulieu River
1810 ships